Jonathan Danladi Gyet Maude (born 1938) is the monarch of Ham (Jaba) Chiefdom, a Nigerian traditional state in southern Kaduna State, Nigeria. He is also known by the title "Chief of Jaba (Ham)".

He is a member of the Maude ruling house of Ham Chiefdom; the other two are the Tiroa and Saghon ruling houses.

In solidarity towards the people of Asholyio (Moroa) and Takad chiefdoms attacked by the Fulani terrorists in Kaura Local Government Area of the state, Maude led a deligation to the local government secretariat, where he was quoted to have said:  He thereafter presented some relief materials to the Agwam Takad, HRH Tobias Nkom Wada who received them with gratitude and prayed that God bring stability to the area and country at large.

HRH Dr. Maude is a recipient of the DINMA 2006 award, one of the PSR National Awards, for "Traditional Leadership".

References

1938 births
Living people
People from Kaduna State 
Nigerian traditional rulers 
African monarchs